Huaribamba District is one of sixteen districts of the Tayacaja Province in Peru.

Geography 
Other mountains are listed below:

Ethnic groups 
The people in the district are mainly Indigenous citizens of Quechua descent. Quechua is the language which the majority of the population (65.63%) learnt to speak in childhood, 34.07% of the residents started speaking using the Spanish language (2007 Peru Census).

References